Pemiscot Township is an inactive township in Pemiscot County, in the U.S. state of Missouri.

Pemiscot Township took its name from Pemiscot Bayou, a former creek within its borders.

References

Townships in Missouri
Townships in Pemiscot County, Missouri